The VP11 is a family of mine-protected patrol vehicles, produced by China North Industries (Norinco).

The family of vehicles were first introduced at a trade show in Zhuhai, China, in November 2014.
The United Arab Emirates indicated interest in placing an order for 150 vehicles at that trade show.

The four-wheeled vehicles are designed with a one-piece armored V-shaped bottom, so that the explosive force of enemy mines will be directed outwards, away from the vehicle's occupants.
One model of the family is designed to serve as an armored personnel carrier, carrying seven soldiers, in addition to the vehicle's driver and commander/gunner. Its roof will mount a remote controlled weapon system, capable of controlling an automatic grenade launcher or machine gun. A paramilitary model will mount less-than-lethal weapons.

References

Armoured fighting vehicles of China
Armoured personnel carriers
Armoured fighting vehicles of the post–Cold War period
Military vehicles introduced in the 2010s